The World Resources Institute (WRI) is a global research non-profit organization established in 1982 with funding from the MacArthur Foundation under the leadership of James Gustave Speth. WRI's activities are focused on seven areas: food, forests, water, energy, cities, climate and ocean.

Organization 
The World Resources Institute (WRI) maintains international offices in the United States, China, India, Indonesia, Mexico, and Brazil. The organization's mission is to promote environmental sustainability, economic opportunity, and human health and well-being. WRI partners with local and national governments, private companies, publicly held corporations, and other non-profits, and offers services including global climate change issues, sustainable markets, ecosystem protection, and environmental responsible governance services. WRI has maintained a 4 out of 4 stars rating from Charity Navigator since 1 October 2008.

In 2014, Stephen M. Ross, an American real estate developer, gave the organization US$30 million to establish the WRI Ross Center for Sustainable Cities.  A report by the Center for International Policy's Foreign Influence Transparency Initiative of the top 50 think tanks on the University of Pennsylvania's Global Go-To Think Tanks rating index found that during the period 2014–2018 World Resources Institute received more funding from outside the United States than any other think tank, with a total of more than US$63 million, though this was described as "unsurprising" given the institute's presence in so many countries.

Initiatives 
WRI's activities are focused on seven areas: food, forests, water, energy, cities, climate and ocean.

WRI initiatives include:

 The Access Initiative, a civil society network dedicated to ensuring that citizens have the right and ability to influence decisions about the natural resources.
 Aqueduct, an initiative to measure, map and understand water risks around the globe.
 CAIT Climate Data Explorer, offering chart tools for historic GHG data, Paris contributions and more.  this is being integrated into the similar platform Climate Watch.
 Champions 12.3, a coalition of executives to accelerate progress toward United Nations Sustainable Development Goal Target 12.3 to tackle food loss and waste.
 Global Forest Watch, an online forest monitoring and alert system.
 The Greenhouse Gas Protocol provides standards, guidance, tools, and trainings for business and government to quantify and manage GHG emissions.
 LandMark, a platform providing maps and information on lands that are collectively held and used by Indigenous peoples and local communities.
 Platform for Accelerating the Circular Economy (PACE), a public-private collaboration platform and project accelerating focusing on building the circular economy. PACE was launched during the 2018 World Economic Forum Annual meeting; from 2019, WRI is supporting the scale-up of PACE and establish an Action Hub in The Hague.
 Renewable Energy Buyers Alliance is an alliance of large clean energy buyers, energy providers, and service providers that is unlocking the marketplace for all non-residential energy buyers to lead a rapid transition to a cleaner, prosperous, zero-carbon renewable energy future. It has over 200 members including Google, GM, Facebook, Walmart, Disney and other large companies, and reached 6 GW capacity in 2018.
 The Science Based Targets initiative (SBTi) helps companies transition to a low-carbon economic profile by setting greenhouse gas emission reduction targets in line with climate science. Through Science Based Targets (SBTs), companies express their intention to reduce their greenhouse gas emissions to limit global warming to well below 2 °C above pre-industrial levels and pursue efforts to limit warming to 1.5 °C.
 WRI Ross Center helps cities grow more sustainably and seeks to improve quality of life in developing countries around the world.
 World Resources Report, WRI's flagship report series. Each report deals with a different topic.

Criticism

Anil Agarwal accused a 1990 study by the World Resources Institute to allocate responsibility for global warming to developing countries. Agarwal considered it flawed, politically motivated, and unjust, and saw it more as exacerbating the North-South divide. In his 1991 paper, he called this an example of environmental colonialism and blamed U.S. overconsumption for global warming.

References

See also 
 
 Rafe Pomerance

Environmental organizations based in Washington, D.C.
Think tanks based in the United States
1982 establishments in the United States
Organizations established in 1982